Claremont County was a county in east central South Carolina. Its county seat was Stateburg. It lasted from its creation in 1785, when it was created from the Camden District, until it was absorbed into the newly created Sumter District in 1800.

References

Former counties, districts, and parishes of South Carolina